Ochromolopis is a genus of moths in the family Epermeniidae described by Jacob Hübner in 1824.

Species
Ochromolopis cana Gaedike, 2013
Ochromolopis chelyodes (Meyrick, 1910) (originally in Epermenia)
Ochromolopis cornutifera Gaedike, 1968 (Australia)
Ochromolopis ictella (Hübner, 1813) (originally in Tinea)
Ochromolopis incrassa Clarke, 1971
Ochromolopis ithycentra (Meyrick, 1926)
Ochromolopis kaszabi Gaedike, 1973
Ochromolopis namibica Gaedike, 2004
Ochromolopis pallida Gaedike, 2004
Ochromolopis ramapoella (Kearfott, 1903) (originally in Epermenia)
Ochromolopis sagittella Gaedike, 2013
Ochromolopis staintonellus (Millière, 1869)
Ochromolopis xeropa (Meyrick, 1909)
Ochromolopis zagulajevi Budashkin & Satshkov, 1991

Former species
Ochromolopis acacivorella Gaedike, 1968
Ochromolopis aphronesa (Meyrick, 1897)
Ochromolopis australica Gaedike, 1968
Ochromolopis bidentata (Braun, 1926) (originally in Epermenia)
Ochromolopis bidentata Gaedike, 1968
Ochromolopis bidentella Gaedike, 1981
Ochromolopis bipunctata Gaedike, 1968
Ochromolopis eurybias (Meyrick, 1897)
Ochromolopis metrothetis (Meyrick, 1921) (originally in Epermenia)
Ochromolopis opsias (Meyrick, 1897)
Ochromolopis paraphronesa Gaedike, 1968
Ochromolopis paropsias Gaedike, 1972
Ochromolopis pseudaphronesa Gaedike, 1972
Ochromolopis queenslandi Gaedike, 1968
Ochromolopis uptonella Gaedike, 1969

Status unknown
Ochromolopis sericella (Hübner, 1811/17) (originally in Tinea), described from Europe

References

  & , 2005: Faunistics of the Epermeniidae from the former USSR (Epermeniidae). Nota lepidopterologica, 28 (2): 123—138. Full article: .
 , 1968: Revision der Epermeniidae Australiens und Ozeaniens (Lepidoptera: Epermeniidae). Pacific Insects 10 (3-4): 599-627. Full article: 
 , 1972: Zweiter Beitrag zur Kenntnis der Epermeniiden-Fauna Australiens und Ozeaniens (Lepidoptera). Beiträge zur Entomologie 22 (3/6): 143-147.
 , 1977: Revision der nearktischen und neotropischen Epermeniidae (Lepidoptera). Beiträge zur Entomologie, 27 (2): 301-312.
 , 2004: New genera and species of epermeniid moths from the Afrotropical Region (Lepidoptera: Epermeniidae). Annals of the Transvaal Museum 41: 41–59.
 , 2006: New and poorly known Lepidoptera from the West Palaearctic (Tineidae, Acrolepiidae, Douglasiidae, Epermeniidae). Nota lepidopterologica 29 (3-4): 159-176. Full article: .
 , 2007 (2009): Some new and interesting Microlepidoptera from the collection of the Zoologisches Forschungsmuseum Alexander Koenig (ZFMK), Bonn (Lepidoptera: Tineidae, Epermeniidae, Acrolepiidae, Douglasiidae). Bonner Zoologische Beiträge 56 (1-2): 101-106. Full article: 
  2013: New or poorly known Epermeniidae of the Afrotropis (Lepidoptera, Epermenioidea).  Beiträge zur Entomologie 63(1): 149-168. Abstract: 

Epermeniidae
Moth genera